Daniel Wilczynski (born 24 August 1956) is a French former professional footballer who played as a defender. He made four Division 1 appearances for Paris FC in the 1978–79 season.

Notes

References 

1956 births
Living people
French footballers
French people of Polish descent
Association football defenders
INF Vichy players
Paris FC players
Jura Dolois Football players
Chaumont FC players
US Nœux-les-Mines players
French Division 3 (1971–1993) players
Ligue 1 players
Ligue 2 players